The Mayor of Central Otago officiates over the Central Otago District of New Zealand which is administered by the Central Otago District Council. The first Mayor of Central Otago was W.S. McIntosh who was elected in 1989, when following the local government reforms of that year, the Central Otago District Council was formed in the place of the previous county and borough councils of Central Otago. 

The Mayor of Central Otago serves a three-year term and acts as the chair of the Council which comprises 11 other elected Councillors. The current Deputy Mayor is Neil Gillespie. The next election for the Mayor and Councillors of the Central Otago District is scheduled for 2022. 

The current Mayor of Central Otago is Tim Cadogan. Cadogan was re-elected unopposed in 2022.

Mayors of Central Otago have been:

References

Central Otago
Central Otago District
Central Otago
Central